Joseph or Joe Shaw may refer to:

Joseph Shaw (boxer) (1938–2005), American boxer
Joseph Shaw (legal writer) (1671–1733), English legal writer
Joseph Shaw (editor) (1874–1952), editor of Black Mask magazine, 1926–1936
Joseph Shaw (Christ's College) (1786–1859), Master of Christ's College, Cambridge
Joseph Shaw, newspaper editor from Westminster, Maryland,  murdered in 1865
Joe Shaw (rugby union) (born 1980), Newcastle Falcons rugby union player
Joe Shaw (footballer, born 1882) (1882–?), forward for Sunderland, Hull City and Grimsby Town
Joe Shaw (footballer, born 1883) (1883–1963), left back for Arsenal and was later caretaker manager at the club
Joe Shaw (footballer, born 1928) (1928–2007), centre half for Sheffield United
Joseph Tweed Shaw (1883–1944), Canadian politician
Joseph Carl Shaw (1955–1985), American murderer executed by the state of South Carolina
Joseph Shaw (philosopher) (born 1971),  British academic and chairman of the Latin Mass Society